The 1967 PGA Championship was the 49th PGA Championship, played July 20–24 at Columbine Country Club in Columbine Valley, Colorado, a suburb south of Denver. Don January won his only major title in an 18-hole playoff over Don Massengale (69-71).
Both had overtaken the leaders with low scores in the fourth round on Sunday.

Columbine was scheduled to host the championship in 1966, but flooding of the course by the South Platte River caused a postponement of a year. Firestone Country Club in Ohio, scheduled to host in 1967, swapped years with Columbine and was the site of the tournament in 1966.

There was a possibility of a boycott of the championship by the top tournament players, due to grievances with the PGA of America. An understanding was achieved several weeks before and the top players entered.

Tommy Aaron carded a course record 65 in the second round to take a four-stroke lead, but a 76 on Saturday dropped him two back and he fell out of contention on Sunday with a 78. The 54-hole leader was Dan Sikes, the chairman of the tournament players committee, who shot a final round 73 and finished a stroke out of the playoff, in a tie for third with Jack Nicklaus.

This was the second and final 18-hole Monday playoff at the PGA Championship, formerly a match play event through 1957. The next playoff was ten years later in 1977 and the format was changed to sudden-death, immediately following the fourth round. It was later changed to a three-hole aggregate format, first used in 2000.

The Open Championship was played the previous week near Liverpool, England, one of five times in the 1960s that these two majors were played in consecutive weeks in July. The PGA Championship moved permanently to August in 1969, where it remained through 2018 (except 1971, when it was played in late February). In 2019, the tournament moved to the weekend before Memorial Day.

Past champions in the field

Made the cut

Missed the cut

Round summaries

First round
Thursday, July 20, 1967

Second round
Friday, July 21, 1967

Source:

Third round
Saturday, July 22, 1967

Source:

Final round
Sunday, July 23, 1967

Source:

Playoff
Monday, July 24, 1967

Scorecard

Source:

References

External links
PGA Media Guide 2012
GolfCompendium.com: 1967 PGA Championship
PGA.com – 1967 PGA Championship

PGA Championship
Golf in Colorado
Sports competitions in Denver
PGA Championship
PGA Championship
PGA Championship
PGA Championship
1960s in Denver